Ngô Viết Phú (born 2 January 1992) is a Vietnamese footballer who plays for V.League 3 club Đồng Nai.

References 

Living people
Vietnamese footballers
V.League 1 players
Association football midfielders
1992 births
SHB Da Nang FC players
Ho Chi Minh City FC players